Young-Suk Kim is an educational psychologist known for her research on language and literacy development. She is Senior Associate Dean and Professor of Education at the University of California, Irvine.

Kim has received several awards for her contributions including the 2013 Presidential Early Career Award for Scientists and Engineers (PECASE) from the White House. She was honored by Contemporary Educational Psychology in 2016 for being "One of the most productive scholars in Educational Psychology" from 2009 to 2014. She also received many awards from Florida State University including the 2013 University Teaching Award, 2014 Developing Scholar Award, and the 2016 Robert M. Gagne Research Award.

Biography 
Kim received her Bachelor of Arts at Kyungpook National University with a major in English linguistics and literature and minor in secondary school teaching in 1993. Kim then earned a Master in Teaching English to Speakers of Other Languages (TESOL) at San Francisco State University in 1997. She received her Master of Education at Harvard University with a focus on human development and culture in 2003. She then obtained her Doctor of Education in human development and psychology at Harvard University in 2007 under the supervision of Catherine E. Snow.

In 2007, Kim became a faculty associate of Florida State University's Florida Center for Reading Research, and an assistant professor at Florida State University's School of Teacher Education. She then worked as a faculty of the Predoctoral Interdisciplinary Research Training (PIRT) Program at the US Department of Education's Institute of Education Sciences from 2009 - 2016. From 2015 - 2016, Kim served as the associate director of the Florida Center for Reading Research. She then started working as a professor at the University of California at Irvine in 2016.

Research 
Kim's current research focuses on language literacy acquisition and instruction. This includes identifying early literacy predictors, reading fluency, reading comprehension, and writing composition of English-speaking children. Kim also examines the development of effective instructional approaches for children from linguistically, culturally, and economically diverse backgrounds. Her research has been supported by the US Department of Education, the Institute of Education Sciences, and the National Institute of Child Heath and Human Development.

One of her most cited works, "Reading fluency: The whole is more than the parts" co-authored with Tami Katzir, Maryanne Wolf, Beth O'Brien, Becky Kennedy, Maureen Lovett and Robin Morris, examined the multidimensional nature of fluency in a sample of 123 dyslexic children in second and third grade. The authors suggest that phonological awareness, rapid letter naming, and orthographic pattern recognition contribute to word-reading skills.

Selected publications 

 Katzir, T., Kim, Y., Wolf, M., O’Brien, B., Kennedy, B., Lovett, M., & Morris, R. (2006). Reading fluency: The whole is more than the parts. Annals of Dyslexia, 56(1), 51–82.
 Kim, Y. S., Petscher, Y., Schatschneider, C., & Foorman, B. (2010). Does growth rate in oral reading fluency matter in predicting reading comprehension achievement?. Journal of Educational Psychology, 102(3), 652–667. 
 Kim, Y. S., Wagner, R. K., & Foster, E. (2011). Relations among oral reading fluency, silent reading fluency, and reading comprehension: A latent variable study of first-grade readers. Scientific Studies of Reading, 15(4), 338–362. 
 Puranik, C. S., Lonigan, C. J., & Kim, Y. S. (2011). Contributions of emergent literacy skills to name writing, letter writing, and spelling in preschool children. Early Childhood Research Quarterly, 26(4), 465–474.

References

External links 

Faculty Profile
Research Lab Website

Living people
American women psychologists
21st-century American psychologists
Kyungpook National University alumni
San Francisco State University alumni
Harvard University alumni
University of California, Irvine faculty
Year of birth missing (living people)
21st-century American women